Wele Nzas (F073) is a Ukrainian-designed, Bulgarian-built multi-mission frigate of the Navy of Equatorial Guinea. The frigate serves as flagship of the navy and was commissioned in 2014.

Design and description 

The ship is armed with two 76.2 mm AK-176 naval guns, each on fore and aft of the ship, two 30 mm AK-630M autocannons located in either side of the funnel, and two MS-227 140 mm 22-barreled rocket launchers in front of the bridge. In addition, the ship could be fitted with guided missiles on the midship.

Her sensors and electronic systems consisted of Positiv-U air/surface search radar with radome, Delta-M fire control radar integrated with Cascade self-defense system, two navigation radars, two opto-electronic target designation and fire control systems, satellite communication antenna and ESM antenna.

Wele Nzas also has a raised helicopter flight deck amidships and carries some boats launched by davits.

Construction and career 
The ship was designed by Asaba Design Center in Mykolaiv, Ukraine. Her keel was laid on 21 May 2012 at MTG Dolphin Shipyard in Varna, Bulgaria. The ship was launched on 26 February 2013 as the salvage and rescue vessel Savior (IMO: 9664500) under Project SV 02. She was procured from Bulgaria using proxy entities in Panama and the Comoros. The ship was then fitted with weaponry in a  navy-owned floating dock at Malabo harbor, Equatorial Guinea by the Astilleros de Guinea Ecuatorial S.A. (ASABA GE) with the help of Ukrainian technicians. Armament and combat systems used on the ship was probably sourced by Impulse 2, a Ukrainian company.

Wele Nzas was commissioned on 3 June 2014 in a ceremony at Malabo harbor by the President Teodoro Obiang Nguema Mbasogo. The president declared the frigate as the flagship of Equatorial Guinenan Navy. The ship was named after the Province of Wele-Nzas. She served as deterrent against threats of piracy in the Gulf of Guinea.

References

External links
News footage of Wele Nzas commissioning ceremony by Africa 24 news channel
Wele Nzas satellite view – WarSearcher.com

2013 ships
Ships built in Bulgaria
Frigates of Bulgaria
Frigate classes
Navy of Equatorial Guinea